Roppolo is a municipality in the Province of Biella in the Italian region Piedmont, located about  northeast of Turin and about  south of Biella.

Roppolo is located on the southern slopes of Ivrea glacial ridge, west to the Lake of Viverone. It borders the following municipalities: Alice Castello, Cavaglià, Cerrione, Dorzano, Salussola, Viverone, Zimone.

The hamlet is mentioned for the first time in a 936 AD document.  It is home to a castle, largely built during the 14th century. Economy is based on the production of wine and kiwifruit.

References

Cities and towns in Piedmont